= Golden Ash, Kentucky =

Unincorporated community in Kentucky, United States

- Unincorporated community
- Location within Kentucky Location within the United States
- Coordinates: 36°51′38″N 83°17′28″W
- Country: United States
- State: Kentucky
- County: Harlan
- Elevation: 1,220 ft (370 m)
- Time zone: UTC-6 (Central (CST))
  - Summer (DST): UTC-5 (CST)
- GNIS feature ID: 492941

Golden Ash is an unincorporated community in Harlan County, Kentucky, United States.
